The Gonaqua (or Gonaguas, meaning "borderers") were a Xhosa ethnic group, descendants of a very old union between the Khoikhoi and the Xhosa. This union predates the arrival of Europeans in South Africa. The Gonaqua have been regarded as outcasts by the Bantus. They were targets during the Second Frontier War, but received protection from the British.

Sources

"Gonaqua, n." Dictionary of South African English. Dictionary Unit for South African English, 2020. Accessed 1 March 2020.

Ethnic groups in South Africa